Jacqui Irwin (born January 3, 1962) is an American politician currently serving in the California State Assembly. She is a Democrat representing the 44th Assembly District, which encompasses eastern portions of Ventura County and the city of Westlake Village. Before being elected to the Assembly in 2014, Irwin worked as a systems engineer at Johns Hopkins University and Teledyne, then served as a two-term Mayor and three-term City Councilmember in Thousand Oaks.

Early life and education 
Irwin was born in the Tarzana neighborhood of Los Angeles to Dutch immigrants John and Barbara Van Egmond, and grew up in the Woodland Hills neighborhood. She graduated with a systems engineering degree from the University of California, San Diego, where she was an Academic All American swimmer.

Career 
After graduating from UC San Diego, Irwin worked as an engineer for three years at the Johns Hopkins University Applied Physics Lab, then for five years at Teledyne. In 2003, Irwin was appointed to the Thousand Oaks Planning Commission, ran for City Council the following year, and became mayor of Thousand Oaks in 2008.

In 2014, Irwin successfully ran as a Democrat in the race to represent California's 44th State Assembly district, defeating Republican opponent Rob McCoy.  Irwin was reelected in 2016, defeating Republican opponent Kerry Nelson. She was reelected again in 2018, defeating Republican opponent Ronda Baldwin-Kennedy.

Legislative tenure 
Irwin is the Chair of the Assembly Committee on Revenue and Taxation, and the Assembly Select Committee on Cybersecurity, and the Assembly Select Committee on Gasoline Supply and Pricing. She also serves on the Committees on Agriculture, Business & Professions, Higher Education, and Privacy and Consumer Protection. She previously served as Chair of the Assembly Committee on Military and Veterans Affairs from 2014-2021.

Irwin has also been appointed to other significant roles including the Governor's Military Council, and as Co-Chair of the National Conference of State Legislature’s Task Force on Cybersecurity.

2015-2016 session 
During her first term in office, Irwin passed significant legislation. Irwin improved the cybersecurity of the state by mandating state agencies undergo independent security assessments, she banned powdered alcohol, expanded the ability of University of California research to be turned into real-world applications, and worked with Attorney General Kamala Harris to create the OpenJustice Web portal to provide better access to criminal justice data.

2017-2018 session 
During her second term in office, Irwin helped secure critical funding for infrastructure projects in Ventura County, including $68.6 million for a grade separation project at Rice Avenue in Oxnard, California, and $9.5 million for emergency wastewater treatment facility repairs in Oxnard, CA.

She continued her work passing significant cybersecurity legislation, enacting into law the first ever security requirement for Internet of Things devices. Irwin also significantly changed how California Community Colleges approached remedial education in an effort to get students into transfer level courses.

2019-2020 session 
In 2019 Irwin focused heavily on gun violence prevention legislation in response to the Borderline Shooting in Thousand Oaks, CA. Her legislation strengthened Gun Violence Restraining Orders (GVROs), in part by allowing them to extend up to five years. She also required law enforcement agencies to have policies about using GVROs. Irwin also secured $3 million to support local law enforcement efforts to recover firearms from individuals listed in the Armed and Prohibited Possessors System.

In October 2019, Irwin pulled out of attending a fundraising event for the family of an officer killed in the Borderline shooting. After the Ventura County Sheriff's Office also withdrew from the fundraiser, citing a policy of non-participation in political events, the event was postponed indefinitely. An organizer of the event was later arrested in Florida for felony violations of charitable solicitation law and misusing charitable funds.

Irwin also authored ACR-17 which renamed a portion of U.S. Route 101 in Thousand Oaks after Sgt. Ron Helus, from the Ventura County Sheriff's Office who died in the line of duty during the Borderline Shooting.

In 2020, Irwin shifted the majority of her efforts towards assisting her district's response to the COVID-19 pandemic. Irwin spearheaded efforts to collect personal protective equipment (PPE) for front line health care workers and organized blood drives during a local shortage.

Irwin also brought together local governments, academics, private businesses, and non-profits to conduct a COVID-19 antibody testing study in Ventura County. Irwin worked with the group to acquire reliable and available serology tests to be used for the study. She also helped identify and secure locations that would be utilized as testing sites for the countywide study which offered free COVID-19 antibody testing to residents.  The antibody testing study was developed to not only understand the prevalence of COVID-19 in Ventura County, but was also modeled to understand the prevalence in targeted groups including first responders, low-income households, and those experiencing homelessness.

Irwin also set the highest level for recycled materials in plastic bottles, authoring a bill with Assemblyman Phil Ting to require plastic beverage containers to contain at least 50% postconsumer recycled plastic content by 2030.

2021-2022 session 

During Irwin’s fourth term in the Assembly she continued to author landmark legislation into law. With support from Attorney General Rob Bonta, Irwin created new rules for online charitable giving providing protections for donors and nonprofits using website like GoFundMe, PayPal Giving Fund, and other online platforms.

Irwin also worked to protect the elderly from hospice fraud by prohibiting incentive payments, a problem highlighted by investigative journalism by the Los Angeles Times.  She partnered with County Clerks to make permanent Californian’s ability to request vital records (e.g. birth, marriage, death certificates) online, rather than visit offices in person.

Personal life
Irwin married Jon Irwin, a corporate executive, in 1986, and has three children. After her efforts to amend provisions of the California Consumer Privacy Act in 2019, which passed unanimously through the Legislature and were signed by the Governor, she received criticism for possible conflicts of interest based on her husband's position as COO of Ring. Irwin claimed that she consults with the Assembly's ethics officer on any potential conflicts of interest.

Elections

2014 California State Assembly

2016 California State Assembly

2018 California State Assembly

2020 California State Assembly

2022 California State Assembly

References

External links 
 
 Campaign website

Democratic Party members of the California State Assembly
Living people
1962 births
21st-century American politicians
People from Encino, Los Angeles
University of California, San Diego alumni
American female swimmers
21st-century American women politicians
Women state legislators in California
American people of Dutch descent
Mayors of places in California
Women mayors of places in California
California city council members
Women city councillors in California
Swimmers from California